Blastodacna lvovskyi is a moth in the family Elachistidae. It is found in Tajikistan.

References

Moths described in 1986
Blastodacna
Moths of Asia